Xianglong may refer to:
Xianglong, a genus of Cretaceous period lizards.
Guizhao Xianglong, Chinese unmanned aerial vehicle concept.
Xianglong Subdistrict, subdistrict in the Hunan Province of the People's Republic of China.
 Dai Xianglong